Turrella is a suburb in southern Sydney, in the state of New South Wales, Australia. Turrella is located 10 km south-west  of the Sydney central business district on the southern bank of Wolli Creek in the local government area of Bayside Council.

Turrella is a mostly residential area. Some light industrial developments are located around Turrella railway station and north along the railway line. A footbridge from Turrella over Wolli Creek links Henderson Street to the eastern side of Earlwood, formerly known as Undercliffe. The footbridge was closed in 2012 by Canterbury Council after it was deemed to be structurally unsound but was repaired and re-opened in November 2013.

History
In 1842, William Favell and his wife Eleanor were farming a property named Hillside on this site.  Their neighbors were the families of Thomas Curtis and Henry Blackwell, who were orchardists and gardeners. The farms and orchards were subdivided when the railway came through. The railway station opened on 21 September 1931. The light industrial buildings were built close to the railway line and one of the biggest factories in the area was the Streets Ice Cream factory, which has since closed.

The post office was originally known as West Arncliffe when it opened on 26 April 1933 but in January 1948 became known as Arncliffe West. It became Turrella in August 1952 but closed on 21 December 1970.

Historical places 
Turrella borders a piece of remnant bushland, the Wolli Creek Valley, beside Wolli Creek. There have been active movements fighting for its preservation in the face of demands for land. The most successful of these prevented the building of the M5 South Western Motorway through the valley, resulting in the road being built as a tunnel under the valley known as the M5 East. Nevertheless, community concern remains over plans to extend the M5 at Bexley.

Turrella also has a number of heritage-listed sites, including:
 18 Loftus Street: Cairnsfoot
 Thompson Street: Wolli Creek Aqueduct

Demographics
In the 2016 Census, there were 2,511 people in Turrella. The most common ancestries were Chinese 15.0%, Lebanese 12.1%, English 11.9%, Australian 11.3% and Irish 4.7%. 45.8% of people were born in Australia. The most common other countries of birth were China 11.6% and Lebanon 4.6%. 36.5% of people only spoke English at home. Other languages spoken at home included Arabic 13.8%, Mandarin 11.1%, Macedonian 5.0% and Cantonese 4.4%.  The most common responses for religion in Turrella were No Religion 28.4%, Islam 18.3% and Catholic 17.2%.

According to the 2011 Australian Bureau of Statistics Census of Population, there were 1,600 people usually resident in Turrella. 42.3% stated they were born overseas with the top countries of birth being Lebanon 9.4%, Macedonia 5.6% and China 5.7%. English was stated as the only language spoken at home by 35.8% of residents and the most common other languages spoken were Arabic 29.6%, Macedonian 9.3%, Cantonese 4.2%, Mandarin 3.2% and Italian 2.1%. The most common responses for religious affiliation were Islam 33.4%, Catholic 19.8% and Orthodox 13.2%.

According to the 2006 Australian Bureau of Statistics Census of Population, there were 1,011 people usually resident in Turrella. 39.4% stated they were born overseas with the top countries of birth being Lebanon 10.8%, Macedonia 7.5% and China 2.6%. English was stated as the only language spoken at home by 41.8% of residents and the most common other languages spoken were Arabic 28.7%, Macedonian 12.7% and Italian 4.3%. The most common responses for religious affiliation were Islam 27.0%, Catholic 20.7% and Orthodox 15.4%.

Schools
Arncliffe West Infants School is located in Loftus Street. The former Cairnsfoot Special School premises is located opposite. The original Cairnsfoot building is heritage listed.

Transport
Turrella railway station is on the Airport & South Line of the Sydney Trains network. Turrella is also serviced by Transit Systems bus route 473 which runs from Rockdale station to Campsie station via Bardwell Valley, Arncliffe, Turrella, Bardwell Park station, Earlwood and Clemton Park.

The M5 South Western Motorway runs beneath parts of Turrella, in a 4 km tunnel. The nearest entrances to travel south-west towards Beverly Hills and Liverpool are located at Arncliffe and Bexley North. The nearest entrances to travel north-east towards Botany and the city are located at Arncliffe.

Notable residents
Chris Flannery, hitman in the Sydney underworld in the 1980s.

References

Suburbs of Sydney
Bayside Council